Daniel H. Johnson (August 18, 1936 – June 29, 2014) was a Republican member of the Kansas House of Representatives, representing the 110th district.  He served from 1997 to 2011.

Johnson had sat on the board of directors of a number of organizations, including Ellis County Extension, Ellis County Farm Bureau, Ellis County Historical Society, Friends of Historic Fort Hays, Kansas Livestock Association, and Trego County Rural Water District 2.

Former committee membership
 Energy and Utilities
 Agriculture and Natural Resources
 Joint Committee on Kansas Security

Major donors
The top 5 donors to Johnson's 2008 campaign:
 Kansas Contractors Association – $1,000
AT&T – $750
 Kansans for Lifesaving Cures – $750
Koch Industries – $500
 Sunflower Electric Power Corp – $500

Death
On June 29, 2014, Dan Johnson died at the Hays Medical Center in Hays, Kansas. He was 77.

References

External links
 Project Vote Smart profile
 Kansas Votes profile
 State Surge - Legislative and voting track record
 Campaign contributions: 1996,1998,2000, 2002, 2004, 2006, 2008

1936 births
2014 deaths
Republican Party members of the Kansas House of Representatives
People from Hays, Kansas
20th-century American politicians
21st-century American politicians
Fort Hays State University alumni